The Gloucester Cup is the common name for three awards of the Australian Defence Force officially called the Duke of Gloucester's Cup, the three awards are presented to the most proficient ship of the Royal Australian Navy (RAN),  infantry battalion of the Australian Army, and squadron of the Royal Australian Air Force (RAAF) during the previous year. The awards were created by Prince Henry, Duke of Gloucester in 1946, while he was serving as the Governor-General of Australia, and were first presented in 1947.

Royal Australian Navy
The RAN Gloucester Cup was initially assessed on the gunnery accuracy of RAN ships, based on the number of sleeve targets hit as a proportion of shells fired. This was quickly found to be impractical, and the criteria for the award was changed to "overall proficiency", based on each ship's level of operational efficiency during a calendar year; husbandry and seamanship; supply and administration; officer and sailor training; divisional systems, morale and discipline; and equipment reliability, maintenance and resourcefulness. As well as the silver trophy, a winning ship is allowed to paint a yellow star on the superstructure of the ship, which remains until the Cup is passed to a new winner.

Winning ships

Australian Army
The regular infantry battalions of the Royal Australian Regiment compete against each other for the  Duke of Gloucester's Cup in an annual military skills competition. To compete for the Cup, each infantry battalion sends a team to the Lone Pine Barracks at Singleton. These teams participate in a five-day competition demonstrating their training and endurance, from which the winning battalion is determined.  First held in 1947 between the Australian battalions then in Japan as part of the British Commonwealth Occupation Force, the inaugural cup was awarded to 67th Australian Infantry Battalion (now the 3rd Battalion, Royal Australian Regiment). Between 1951 and 1971 the competition was not held due to operational commitments. Competition recommenced on a regular basis between 1972 and 1998; however, was again ceased as a result of operations in East Timor. The competition recommenced in 2003.

Winning Battalions

Royal Australian Air Force
The RAAF's Gloucester Cup recognises the most proficient flying squadron during a calendar year. The winner is announced at the Air Force Awards night, held in April or May annually. Originally awarded for the most proficient squadron, the basis for the award changed in 1989 and again in 1993 and the Cup is now awarded annually to the most proficient Wing, Squadron or Operational Unit within the RAAF's Air Command.

The selection process considers the unit's achievement of objectives set for the year, initiatives taken to develop proficiency in operations, administration, dress and bearing, and morale.

The most-awarded unit is No. 36 Squadron, with seven Cups. In 1991, No. 2 Airfield Defence Squadron became the first non-flying unit awarded the Cup.

Winning squadrons

Citations

References

Royal Australian Navy
Australian Army
Royal Australian Air Force
Military awards and decorations of Australia
Military excellence competitions
Military skills competitions